Conrad Marca-Relli (born Corrado Marcarelli; June 5, 1913 – August 29, 2000) was an American artist who belonged to the early generation of New York School Abstract Expressionist artists whose artistic innovation by the 1950s had been recognized across the Atlantic, including Paris. New York School Abstract Expressionism, represented by Jackson Pollock, Willem de Kooning, Franz Kline, Robert Motherwell, Marca-Relli and others became a leading art movement of the postwar era.

Biography
Marcarelli (he changed the spelling later in life) was born in Boston. His parents Cosimo and Genovina Marcarelli were Italian immigrants from Benevento. Marcarelli moved to New York City when he was 13 where he grew up with his brother Ettore, and sisters Dora and Ida. In 1930 he studied at the Cooper Union for a year. And a year later he opened his own studio in New York and managed to earn an income by teaching and producing occasional illustrations for the daily and weekly press. He later supported himself by working for the Works Progress Administration, first as a teacher and then with mural painting divisions of the Federal Art Project during this period he won the Logan Medal of the Arts. He served in the US Army military service during World War II (1941–1945).

Marca-Relli taught at Yale University from 1954 to 1955 and from 1959 to 1960, and at the University of California, Berkeley. 
In 1953, he bought a house near Jackson Pollock's home in Springs, East Hampton. As his career progressed, he increasingly distanced himself from the New York School.

He lived and worked in many countries around the world, eventually settling in Parma, Italy with his wife, Anita Gibson, whom he married in 1951.
Conrad Marca-Relli died on August 29, 2000, in Parma, at the age of 87.

Career
After the war Marca-Relli joined the "Downtown Group" which represented group of artists who found studios in lower Manhattan in the area bounded by 8th and 12th street between First and Sixth Avenues during the late 1940s and early 1950s. During the late 1940s and early 1950s, he was actively involved in the avant-garde art world in Greenwich Village. These artists were called the "Downtown Group" as opposed to the "Uptown Group" established during the war at The Art of This Century Gallery.

His first one-man show was in New York City in 1948. 
In 1949 Marca-Relli was among the founders of  the "Artists' Club" located at 39 East 8th Street. He was selected by his fellow artists to show in the Ninth Street Show held on May 21 to June 10, 1951. The show was located at 60 East 9th Street on the first floor and the basement of a building which was about to be demolished.

The artists celebrated not only the appearance of the dealers, collectors and museum people on the 9th Street, and the consequent exposure of their work but they celebrated the creation and the strength of a living community of significant dimensions.

Conrad Marca-Relli was among the 24 out of a total 256 New York School artists included in the Ninth Street Show and in all the following New York Painting and Sculpture Annuals from 1953 to 1957. These Annuals were important because the participants were chosen by the artists themselves.

Marca-Relli's early cityscapes, still lifes, circus themes and architectural motifs are reminiscent of Italian surrealist painter Giorgio de Chirico. Throughout his career, Marca-Relli created monumental-scale collages. He combined oil painting and collage, employing intense colors, broken surfaces and expressionistic spattering. He also experimented with metal and vinyl materials. Over the years the collages developed an abstract simplicity, evidenced by black or somber colors and rectangular shapes isolated against a neutral backdrop.

In 1967, the Whitney Museum of American Art gave him a retrospective show.

The Archivio Marca-Relli, which was established by the artist and Galleria d'arte Niccoli in Parma in 1997, collects information about Conrad Marca-Relli and archives his work for a future general catalogue.

Exhibitions

1947, 1949, 1951: Niveau Gallery, New York City
1948-1949: Galleria Il Cortile, Rome
1953, 1956, 1958: Stable Gallery, New York City
1956: Frank Perls Gallery, Los Angeles & Hollywood
1957: Galleria La Tartaruga, Rome
1957, 1962:Galleria del Naviglio, Milan
1959, 1960–1964: Kootz Gallery, New York City
1960: Sharon Playhouse Gallery, Sharon, Connecticut
1961: Galerie Schmela, Düsseldorf; Bolles Gallery, San Francisco; Joan Peterson Gallery, Boston; Instituto de Arte Contemporáneo, Lima
1962: Galerie de France, Paris;
1963: Galerie Charles Lienhard, Zürich; Tokyo Gallery, Tokyo
1965: Galería Bonino, Buenos Aires
1967: James David Gallery, Coral Gables, Florida; Makler Gallery, Philadelphia; Whitney Museum of American Art, New York City; Rose Art Museum, Brandeis University, Waltham, Massachusetts
1968: University of Alabama, Tuscaloosa, Alabama; Alpha Gallery, Boston; Albright-Knox Art Gallery, Buffalo, New York
1969: Seattle Art Museum, Seattle; Reed College, Portland, Oregon
1970: University of Maryland Art Gallery, College Park, Maryland; Norton Gallery and School of Art, West Palm Beach, Florida
1970, 1975, 1979: Marlborough Gallery, New York City
1971: Galerie Schmela, Düsseldorf; Fort Lauderdale Museum of Art, Fort Lauderdale, Florida; Lowe Art Museum at University of Miami, Coral Gables, Florida
1972, 1975: Galería Carl Van der Voort, Ibiza
1973: Galería Ynguanzo, Madrid;  Galerie Numaga, Auvernier, Neuchâtel;  Galerie Bahlsen, Berlin
1974, Marlborough Galerie, Zürich; Makler Gallery, Philadelphia
1975, Marlborough-Goddard Gallery, Toronto and Montreal
1977, Galería Lanzenberg, Ibiza;  Cordier & Ekstrom Gallery, New York City
1978, Galería Joan Prats, Barcelona
1978–1979: Carone Gallery, Fort Lauderdale, Florida
1979: Fort Lauderdale Museum of Art. Fort Lauderdale, Florida
1979–1980: John & Mable Ringling Museum of Art, Sarasota, Florida
1981: Hokin Gallery, Chicago
1982: Phoenix Gallery, Washington, D.C.; G.M.B. Gallery, Birmingham, Michigan
1983: Alex Rosenberg Gallery, New York City
1985–1987, 1989, 1991: Marisa del Re Gallery, New York City
1986: R.H. Love Gallery, Chicago
1990: Riva Yares Gallery, Scottsdale, Arizona
1990: 2002: Galleria d'Arte Niccoli, Parma
1996: Vered Gallery, East Hampton, New York
1998: Fondazione Peggy Guggenheim, Venice
2000: Institut Mathildenhöhe, Darmstadt
2002: Galleria d'arte Niccoli, Parma
2004: Joan T. Washburn Gallery, New York City; Galleria Open Art, Prato
2006: Lagorio Arte Contemporanea, Brescia
2008: Rotonda della Besana, Milan
2008: Fort Lauderdale (Florida), Museum of Art
2009: Knoedler & Company Gallery, New York City
2010: Galleria d'arte Bergamo, Bergamo
2011: Knoedler & Company Gallery, New York City
2011: Pollock Krasner House&Study Center, East Hampton
2012: Ronchini Gallery, London
2016: Hollis Taggart Galleries, New York City
2016: Galleria Open Art, Prato 
2016: Repetto Gallery, London
2017: Pavel Zoubok Gallery, New York
2018: De Primi Fine Art, Lugano
2019: Artefiera, Bologna (monographic booth)
2019: Ronchini Gallery, London

Works in Museums and Public Collections

James A. Michener Art Museum, Doylestown, Pennsylvania
Allentown Art Museum, Allentown, Pennsylvania
The University of Michigan Museum of Art, Ann Arbor, Michigan
High Museum of Art, Atlanta,
Jack S. Blanton Museum of Art, Austin, Texas
Museu d'Art Contemporani MACBA, Barcelona
University of California, Berkeley Art Museum, Berkeley, California
Sammlung Reinhard Onnasch, Berlin
Solomon R. Guggenheim Museum, Bilbao
Boca Raton Museum of Art, Boca Raton, Florida
Albright-Knox Art Gallery, Buffalo, New York
Fogg Art Museum, Cambridge, Massachusetts
Harvard University Art Museums, Cambridge, Massachusetts
The Art Institute of Chicago, Chicago
Cleveland Museum of Art, Cleveland
Museum of Art and Archaeology, Columbia, Missouri
University of Missouri, Columbia, Missouri
Lowe Art Museum, Coral Gables, Florida
Denver Art Museum, Denver
Detroit Institute of Arts, Detroit
Museum of Art Fort Lauderdale, Fort Lauderdale, Florida
Wadsworth Atheneum, Hartford, Connecticut
Houston Museum of Fine Arts, Houston
Indianapolis Museum of Art, Indianapolis
Sheldon Memorial Art Gallery, Lincoln, Nebraska
Los Angeles County Museum of Art, Los Angeles
Walker Art Center, Minneapolis
Minneapolis Institute of Arts, Minneapolis
Yale University Art Gallery, New Haven, Connecticut
Solomon R. Guggenheim Museum, New York City
Metropolitan Museum of Art, New York City
Governor Nelson A. Rockefeller Empire State Plaza Art Collection, Albany, NY
Museum of Modern Art, New York City
Whitney Museum of American Art, New York City
Collection of the Chase Manhattan Bank, New York City
Fred Jones Jr. Museum of Art, Norman, Oklahoma
Pennsylvania Academy of Fine Arts, Philadelphia
Carnegie Institute, Pittsburgh
Portland Art Museum, Portland, Oregon
Neuberger Museum of Art, Purchase, New York
Memorial Art Gallery, Rochester, New York
San Francisco Museum of Modern Art, San Francisco
John & Mable Ringling Museum of Art, Sarasota, Florida
Telfair Museum of Art, Savannah, Georgia
Seattle Art Museum, Seattle
Mildred Lane Kemper Art Museum, St. Louis, Missouri
St. Paul Gallery of Art, Saint Paul, Minnesota
Munson-Williams-Proctor Arts Institute, Utica, New York
Fondazione Peggy Guggenheim, Venice
Rose Art Museum at Brandeis University, Waltham, Massachusetts
National Gallery of Art, Washington, D.C.
Smithsonian American Art Museum, Washington, D.C.
Colby College Museum of Art, Waterville, Maine

See also

Action painting

References

Catalogs
Corrado di Marca-Relli. oils; Text by H. Elkin; Exhibition: Niveau Gallery New York, 1947
Corrado di Marca-Relli, New Paintings; Exhibition: The New Gallery, New York, 1951
Marca-Relli: Pastes a painting; Parker Tyler in "ArtNews", November New York, 1955
Marca-Relli; Text by Gillo Dorfles; Exhibition: Galleria del Naviglio, Milano, 1957
Marca-Relli - Kootz; Text by W.Rubin; Exhibition: Kootz Gallery, New York, 1959
William C Agee, Conrad Marca-Relli (New York, Published in the occasion of the personal exhibition at Whitney Museum of American Art by F.A. Praeger, 1967.) OCLC: 1555599
Conrad Marca-Relli; Marlborough-Gerson Gallery, Marca-Relli Feb. 1970 (New York : Marlborough-Gerson Gallery; Associated galleries: Marlborough Fine Art (London) Ltd., Marlborough Galleria d'Arte, 1970) OCLC: 56224536
Conrad Marca-Relli; Cordier & Ekstrom, Marca-Relli, new constructions & collages on paper : March 23 to April 23, 1977 (New York : Cordier & Ekstrom, 1977) OCLC: 47714830
Conrad Marca-Relli; Santiago Amón; Galeria Joan Prats, Marca-Relli 1976-1978(Barcelona : Ediciones Polígrafa, [1978?]) , ; OCLC: 6284061
Conrad Marca-Relli, Conrad Marca Relli : the early years, 1955-1962: February 3-27, 1979 (New York : Marlborough Gallery, 1979.) OCLC: 6059559
Conrad Marca-Relli;  Alex Rosenberg Gallery, Conrad Marca-Relli, homage to la belle epoque : new works : October 5-31, 1983 (New York, N.Y. : Alex Rosenberg Gallery, [1983]) OCLC: 47715196
Marca-Relli; Text by Dore Ashton; Galleria d'Arte Niccoli, Parma, Italy 1990. Exhibition: October 6-November 26, 1990
 Reclaiming Artists of the New York School Toward a More Inclusive view of the 1950s, Exhibition: March 18-April 22, Baruch College CUNY, New York City, 1994 Mishkin Gallery
Marca-Relli:Tensioni Composte/Composite Tensions; Works from 1939 to 1997; Text by Bruno Corà; Pacini Editore and Galleria Open Art, Prato; 2004 [anthological exhibition, October 14, 2004 – January 8, 2005, Prato, Galleria Open Art] 
Conrad Marca-Relli; The New York Years 1945 - 1967; Text by Jasper Sharp; Knoedler & Company Publisher, New York, 2009; Exhibition: September 12 - November 14, 2009, New York, Knoedler & Company Gallery 
Conrad Marca-Relli. City to town, essays by Carter Ratcliff 2011, Knoedler&Company Gallery publisher, New York, 2011; exhibition: May 5 - July 29, 2011
Conrad Marca-Relli. The Springs Years 1953 - 1956, essays by Carter Ratcliff 2011, Pollock-Krasner House and Study Center publisher, New York, 2011; exhibition: May 5 - July 29, 2011
Conrad Marca-Relli. The Architecture of Action, essays by David Anfam and Kenneth Baker, Ronchini Gallery publisher, London,  exhibition October 10 - November 24, 2012
Conrad Marca-Relli. Reconsidered, Essay by William C. Agee, Hollis Taggart Galleries publisher, New York, 2016; Exhibition: January 21 - March 5, 2015, Hollis Taggart Galleries, New York

Books
 Arnason, H. Harvard. Marca-Relli.  New York: H. N. Abrams, 1963.
 Marca-Relli 1976-1978, Santiago Amon, 1978. Publisher: Galeria Joan Prats, Barcelona.
 Conrad Marca-Relli; Luca Massimo Barbero ed.; Peggy Guggenheim Collection,  Conrad Marca-Relli (Milano: Electa, ©1998) /; OCLC 40848684
 Marca-Relli, Klaus Wolbert and Anja Hespelt,Mathildenhőhe Darmstadt, 2000 
Marika Herskovic, New York School Abstract Expressionists Artists Choice by Artists, (New York School Press, 2000.) . pp. 8,12,16,25,37,234-37
 Marca-Relli, l'amico americano - sintonie e dissonanze con Afro e Burri, Marco Vallora 2002, Parma, Publisher: Galleria d'Arte Niccoli
 Marika Herskovic, American Abstract Expressionism of the 1950s An Illustrated Survey, (New York School Press, 2003.) . pp. 218–221
 Conrad Marca-Relli, first monograph and catalogue raisonné, essays by David Anfam, Magdalena Dabrowski and Marco Vallora, Museum S.r.l./Bruno Alfieri editore, Milano, 2008; 

External links
 Conrad Marca-Relli Biography and Images: Hollis Taggart Galleries
 
 

1913 births
2000 deaths
Abstract expressionist artists
American expatriates in Italy
20th-century American painters
American male painters
Painters from New York City
Federal Art Project artists
Modern painters
Artists from Boston
Yale University faculty
United States Army personnel of World War II
People from Springs, New York
American people of Italian descent
American emigrants to Italy
20th-century American male artists